Associazione Calcio Calenzano is an Italian association football club located in Calenzano, Tuscany. It currently plays in Eccelenza Toscana.

Football clubs in Tuscany
Association football clubs established in 1966
Italian football clubs established in 1966